Faouz Faidine Ali Attoumane (born 4 January 1994) is a Comorian international footballer who plays for Fomboni, as a midfielder.

Career
Born in Fomboni, Attoumane has played for Fomboni and FC Nouadhibou.

He made his international debut for Comoros in 2015.

References

1994 births
Living people
Comorian footballers
Comoros international footballers
Fomboni FC players
FC Nouadhibou players
Association football midfielders
Comorian expatriate footballers
Comorian expatriates in Mauritania
Expatriate footballers in Mauritania